Walter R. Hibbard Jr (January 20, 1918 – February 24, 2010) was an American metallurgist, a distinguished professor at Virginia Polytechnic Institute and State University and the 11th director of the U.S. Bureau of Mines in President Johnson's administration.

Early life
Walter R. Hibbard Jr. was born on January 20, 1918, in Bridgeport, Connecticut. He received a bachelor's degree in chemistry from Wesleyan University in 1939. He then graduated from Yale University in 1942 with a PhD in metallurgy.

Career
Hibbard served as a lieutenant in the metallurgical section of the U.S. Navy's Bureau of Ships during World War II in Washington, D.C.

Hibbard then became an assistant professor of metallurgy at Yale University and was promoted five years later to associate professor. He also served as the director of the engineering division of the New Haven YMCA Junior College (precursor of the University of New Haven).

In 1951, Hibbard left Yale to become a research associate in materials processes at General Electric Research Laboratory in Schenectady, New York. He then served as an adjunct professor of metallurgical engineering at the Rensselaer Polytechnic Institute from 1952 to 1965. At General Electric, Hibbard became manager of alloy studies and then manager of General Electric's metallurgy and ceramic research.

On December 1, 1965, Hibbard was appointed by President Lyndon B. Johnson to become the director of the U.S. Bureau of Mines. He was confirmed by the U.S. Senate in January 1966. He remained in that role until April 1, 1968. Hibbard noted threats to the adequacy of the nation's mineral supplies and advocated for minerals policy for the United States.

In 1968, Hibbard joined the Owens-Corning Fiberglass Corporation as its vice president of research and development. He then became the vice president for technical service of Owens-Corning in Toledo, Ohio. In 1974, he returned to Washington, D.C. as the deputy director and specialist on fossil fuels with the Energy Research and Development Office of the Federal Energy Administration during the 1970s energy crisis.

In 1974, he left his role at the Federal Energy Administration to join the faculty of Virginia Tech. He was appointed as a distinguished professor of engineer. In 1977, he was named the first director of Virginia Coal and Energy Research, an interdisciplinary study and research facility at Virginia Tech created by the Virginia General Assembly on March 30, 1977. He retired in 1988.

Personal life
Hibbard married Charlotte Tracy, who died in 1970. He later married Louise. He had one daughter and two sons: Diana, Douglas and Lawrence.

Awards
He was a member of the National Academy of Engineering elected in 1966 "for metallurgy". The National Academy of Engineering said that Hibbard was "world renowned for his scholarship of metallurgy".

Hibbard was a fellow of the American Ceramic Society, American Academy of Arts and Sciences, American Association for the Advancement of Science, American Society for Metals and the Metallurgical Society of the American Institute of Mining, Metallurgical, and Petroleum Engineers (AIME).

He received the following awards:
 1950 – Rossiter W. Raymond Award, AIME
 1966 - honorary Doctor of Law degree from Michigan Technological University
 1967 – James Douglas Gold Medal, AIME
 1968 – honorary Doctor of Engineering degree from Montana College of Mineral Science and Technology
 1971 – Henry Krumb Lecturer, AIME

References 

1918 births
2010 deaths
People from Bridgeport, Connecticut
Wesleyan University alumni
Yale University alumni
American metallurgists
United States Navy personnel of World War II
Yale University faculty
University of New Haven faculty
Rensselaer Polytechnic Institute faculty
Virginia Tech faculty
General Electric employees
United States Department of Energy officials
Corning Inc.
United States Bureau of Mines personnel
Members of the United States National Academy of Engineering
Fellows of the American Ceramic Society
Fellows of the American Academy of Arts and Sciences
Fellows of the American Association for the Advancement of Science